Vasti Jackson (pronounced Vast-eye) (born October 20, 1959) is an American electric blues guitarist, singer, songwriter and record producer. He has also been the musical director, and guitarist for Z. Z. Hill, Johnnie Taylor, Denise LaSalle, Little Milton, Bobby Bland, and Katie Webster, plus Jackson has worked with those involved in gospel music including the Williams Brothers, the Jackson Southernaires, and Daryl Coley.

In the 59th Annual Grammy Awards, Jackson's album, The Soul of Jimmie Rodgers was nominated for the Best Traditional Blues Album category.

Life and career
Jackson was born in McComb, Mississippi, United States, and he attended McComb High School. When he was a small boy he lived one block away from the train tracks which fascinated Jackson, and when old enough he hopped the train to travel short distances.  At the age of twelve the railroad police caught his juvenile hobo act, although he retained a lifetime love of the railroad.  Through his family he came to hear blues music, which ignited his second love. Jackson studied music at Jackson State University. He played in the juke joints around McComb, and his musical learning curve continued so that by the late 1980s and into the early 1990s, Vasti was employed as a session musician by both Malaco Records and Alligator Records. By 1993, Jackson was serving as the musical director on the television program, Blues Goin' On.

Also in 1993, Jackson's self-penned track, ""Let the Juke Joint Jump"  was covered on Koko Taylor's album, Force of Nature. The following year, Jackson played on B.B. King's Grammy Award winning album, Blues Summit. In 1996, Jackson self-released his debut solo album, Vas-tie Jackson.

Jackson turned his hand to record production in 2000, with co-production credits on the Bobby Rush album, Hoochie Man, which was nominated for a Grammy Award the following year. In 2002, Jackson provided backing vocals on "Only a Dream in Rio" on Cassandra Wilson's album, Belly of the Sun. The following year, Jackson was one of the performers in Warming by the Devil's Fire, one of the film documentaries in the series, The Blues, produced by Martin Scorsese. No Borders to the Blues (2003) was his next solo album. Woman Thou Art Loosed was a 2004 American drama film directed by Michael Schultz and written by Stan Foster. Jackson was the music producer for the film's soundtrack.

He returned to production work in 2004, with his work on Henry Butler's Homeland album on Basin Street Records. Jackson also played guitar and undertook backing vocals on the collection. In 2005, Jackson co-wrote and produced the track "Hello", on Morris Mills's album, Love & Coffee. Whilst Jackson's own composition, "Casino in the Cotton Field", appeared in the Lifetime Television Network film, Infidelity (2006). Jackson spent time touring his own work, which saw him appear in locations across the globe. In 2010, Jackson released his next studio album, Stimulus Man. The following year, Jackson performed at the New Orleans Jazz & Heritage Festival and played the title role in the play, Robert Johnson The Man, The Myth, The Music! In June 2012, Jackson performed at the Chicago Blues Festival. The same year he was inducted into the Mississippi Musicians Hall of Fame and, in 2013, Jackson performed at Super Bowl XLVII.

His next album, New Orleans, Rhythm Soul Blues, was released in 2013, before he was appointed in July the following year as a cultural ambassador for Mississippi. In February 2015, Jackson was on the cover of that month's issue of Living Blues magazine. Two months later he was one of the star performers at the Byron Bay Bluesfest in Australia, in the year he was also named as the Albert King Lifetime Guitar Award recipient. In April 2016, Jackson was a featured performer at the opening of the National Blues Museum, and played in July at the Porretta Soul Festival in Italy 

His own, The Soul of Jimmie Rodgers, album was issued by CD Baby, which celebrated Jackson's appreciation of the influence of Jimmie Rodgers on the history of American music. Jackson had earlier stated in March 2015 that, "I like to talk about the triumph of the blues. Looking at struggle and rising above it. It’s an art form derived from the necessities of life, having to navigate oppression."

Jackson was a guest performer on the title track of Bobby Rush's 2016 album, Porcupine Meat. It earned Rush a Grammy Award nomination for Best Traditional Blues Album, which placed Jackson in direct competition with Rush for the award.

Discography

Solo albums

See also
 List of electric blues musicians

References

External links

Blues Blast 2015 interview
Living Blues 2014 interviews
Vasti Jackson Interview NAMM Oral History Library (2019)

1959 births
Living people
People from McComb, Mississippi
American blues guitarists
American male guitarists
American blues singer-songwriters
American male singer-songwriters
Record producers from Mississippi
Blues musicians from Mississippi
Electric blues musicians
20th-century American guitarists
21st-century American guitarists
Singer-songwriters from Mississippi
Guitarists from Mississippi
Jackson State University alumni
20th-century American male musicians
21st-century American male musicians